Battle of the Nations is an alternative name for the Battle of Leipzig (1813).

Battle of the Nations may also refer to:

 The Battle of Nations (wargame), a 1975 board wargame simulating the 1813 battle
 Leipzig: The Battle of Nations, a 1969 board wargame simulating the 1813 battle  
 Battle of the Nations (Medieval Tournament), a modern International Medieval Tournament and festival held yearly in Europe, in which a number of nations field a team
 "Battle of the Nations" (song), a World War I era song released in 1915